The 1986 Los Angeles Rams season was the franchise's 49th season in the National Football League, their 39th overall, and their 41st in the Greater Los Angeles Area. The season began with the Rams looking to improve on their 11–5 record from 1985, which ended with them getting shut out by the Chicago Bears in the NFC Championship Game, 24–0. The Rams began the season with three straight wins against the St. Louis Cardinals, San Francisco 49ers, and Indianapolis Colts. However, in Week 4, the Philadelphia Eagles (0–3) upset the Rams, 34–20. The Rams would then win four of their next five, including a 20–17 win over the Bears in a rematch of the NFC Championship Game. The Rams would then close out the season with losses in four of their final seven games to end the year 10–6, good enough for second place in the NFC West behind the 49ers (10–5–1). In the playoffs, the Rams lost to the Washington Redskins, 19–7, in the NFC Wild Card Game to end the season with an overall record of 10–7.

Offseason

NFL Draft 

Jim Everett (Quarterback, Purdue University) was selected by the Houston Oilers as the third pick in the first round, and was the first quarterback taken. Unable to work out a contract agreement with Everett, the Oilers traded his rights to the Rams. In exchange for Everett, the Rams sent the Oilers guard Kent Hill, defensive end William Fuller, their first pick and fifth pick in the 1987 NFL Draft, and their first pick in the 1988 NFL Draft.

Roster 

Source:

Regular season

Schedule

Standings

Playoffs

Awards and records 
 Eric Dickerson, NFC Pro Bowl selection
 Eric Dickerson, All-Pro selection
 Eric Dickerson, NFL Offensive Player of the Year
 Eric Dickerson, UPI NFC Player of the Year
 Carl Ekern, NFC Pro Bowl selection
 Jerry Gray, NFC Pro Bowl selection
 Dennis Harrah, NFC Pro Bowl selection
 LeRoy Irvin, NFC Pro Bowl selection
 Jackie Slater, NFC Pro Bowl selection
 Doug Smith, NFC Pro Bowl selection

Let's Ram It 
The team recorded a promotional video, Let's Ram It by "The Rammers", starring multiple players with solo verses:
 Verse 1: Jackie Slater, Nolan Cromwell, Gary Jeter, Norwood Vann, Dennis Harrah
 Verse 2: David Hill, Jim Collins, Ron Brown, Tony Hunter
 Verse 3: Barry Redden, Carl Ekern, Johnnie Johnson, LeRoy Irvin, Eric Dickerson
Dance segments of the video show the above players, plus Tom Newberry. The song features a number of double entendre lyrics.

See also 
Other Anaheim–based teams in 1986
 California Angels (Anaheim Stadium)
 1986 California Angels season

References

External links 
 1986 Los Angeles Rams Season at Pro-Football Reference

Los Angeles Rams
Los Angeles Rams seasons
Los Ang